Dendronotus patricki is a species of sea slug, a dendronotid nudibranch, a shell-less marine gastropod mollusc in the family Dendronotidae.

Distribution 
This species was described from a whalefall, a dead whale which was experimentally placed in Monterey Canyon, California at a depth of 1820 m. It was also seen on video from an ROV at another whalefall in Santa Cruz Basin,  at a depth of 1676 m.

Description
Dendronotus patricki is a translucent species of Dendronotus with no surface markings and a reddish-brown hue to the body. It grows to at least 25 mm in length. There is a small amount of opaque white pigment at the tips of the dorsal appendages, velar appendages and rhinophore sheath papillae.

Habitat
Dendronotus patricki was found crawling on a muddy seabed. Its stomach contents included structures thought to be nematocysts. It is possible that it feeds on burrowing cerianthid anemones as does Dendronotus iris.

References

Dendronotidae
Gastropods described in 2011